Jehan Vaillant (also spelled Johannes Vayllant) was a French composer and music theorist. He is named immediately after Guillaume de Machaut by the Règles de la seconde rhétorique, which describes him as a "master … who had a school of music in Paris". Besides five (possibly six) pieces of music surviving to his name, he was also the author of a treatise on tuning. With Grimace and F. Andrieu and P. des Molins, Vaillant was part of the post-Machaut generation whose music shows few distinctly ars subtilior features, leading scholars to recognize Vaillant's work as closer to the ars nova style of Machaut.

Life and career
Vaillant's works are conserved in the Chantilly Manuscript, which is also the main source for the works of the Papal singers Matheus de Sancto Johanne, Johannes Symonis Hasprois and Johannes Haucourt. This connexion with the Papal group suggests to certain modern scholars that Vaillant may be the same person who entered the Papal chapel at Avignon as capellanus Johannes Valentis or Valhant on 26 November 1352, during the pontificate of Clement VI. This Vaillant died, still in Papal service, in 1361, probably of bubonic plague. The discovery by Israel Adler, the historian of Hebrew music theory, of an anonymous Hebrew treatise by a Parisian student of Vaillant's shows, in Adler's estimation, that the latter was lecturing the former late into the fourteenth century. A more likely identification of the composer would then be with one of several men with the same name who served John, Duke of Berry (r. 1360–1416), during the latter decades of the century. Léopold Delisle made yet a third suggestion: that the composer is the "Poitevin Jean Vaillant" who made an abrégé du roman de Brut—an abridged version of the Roman de Brut—in 1391.

Music
Vaillant may have been "a younger contemporary of Machaut", but if, as the Chantilly Manuscript records, one of his rondeaux was copied in Paris in 1369, then he was "rhythmically in advance of Machaut’s style". This rondeau has two texts, Dame doucement and Doulz amis, while another has three, Tres doulz amis, Ma dame and Cent mille fois. Two of his rondeaux are monotextual: Pour ce que je ne say, which is isorhythmic and pedagogical, and Quiconques veut, a polymetric piece that is actually anonymous but sometimes ascribed to Vaillant. Of his works, only the ballade Onques Jacob is "fully in the style of Machaut".

Vaillant's Par maintes foys, a virelai with imitation bird-calls, was probably one of the most popular works of the time, certainly one of the most copied, surviving in nine sources, including versions with two voices, an added cantus, a Latin contrafactum and one with a German contrafactum by Oswald von Wolkenstein.

Works

Editions

References

Notes

Citations

Sources

Further reading

 Ursula Günther. "Johannes Vaillant". Speculum musicae artis: Festgabe für Heinrich Husmann. H. Becker and R. Gerlach, eds. (Munich, 1970), 171–85
 Fernand Leclercq. "Questions à propos d'un fragment récemment découvert d’une chanson du XIVe siècle: une autre version de ‘Par maintes fois ai owi’ de Johannes Vaillant". Musik und Text in der Mehrstimmigkeit des 14. und 15. Jahrhunderts (Wolfenbüttel, 1980), 197–228.
 Christopher Page. "Fourteenth-century Instruments and Tunings: A Treatise by Jean Vaillant? (Berkeley, MS 744)". Galpin Society Journal, 33 (1980), 17–35.

External links
 
 Works by Jehan Vaillant in the Medieval Music Database from La Trobe University
 

French composers
French male composers
14th-century births
14th-century deaths
Ars nova composers
Year of birth unknown
Year of death unknown